Senator Bennett or Bennet may refer to:

Members of the United States Senate
Bob Bennett (politician) (1933–2016), U.S. Senator from Utah from 1993 to 2011
Michael Bennet (born 1964), U.S. Senator from Colorado since 2009
Wallace F. Bennett (1898–1993), U.S. Senator from Utah from 1951 to 1974

United States state senate members
Albert E. Bennett (1914–1971), Illinois State Senate
David S. Bennett (1811–1894), New York State Senate
Don Bennett (politician) (1931–1987), Alaska State Senate
Frank P. Bennett Jr. (1878–1965), Massachusetts State Senate
George Bennett (Wisconsin politician), Wisconsin State Senate
Granville G. Bennett (1833–1910), Iowa State Senate
Hiram Pitt Bennet (1826–1914), Colorado State Senate
J. Henry Bennett (1876–1956), Wisconsin State Senate
James R. Bennett (1940–2016), Alabama State Senate
John D. Bennett (1911–2005), New York State Senate
John O. Bennett (born 1948), New Jersey State Senate
Ken Bennett (born 1959), Arizona State Senate
Louis Bennett (politician) (died 1959), New York State Senate
Michael S. Bennett (born 1945), Florida State Senate
Philip Allen Bennett (1881–1942), Missouri State Senate
Richard A. Bennett (born 1963), Maine State Senate
Robert Frederick Bennett (1927–2000), Kansas State Senate
Scott M. Bennett (born 1977), Illinois State Senate
Stephen O. Bennett (1807–1886), Wisconsin State Senate
Thomas W. Bennett (territorial governor) (1831–1893), Indiana State Senate
Thomas Bennett Jr. (1781–1865), South Carolina State Senate
Van S. Bennett (1836–1914), Wisconsin State Senate
Wayne D. Bennett (1927–2015), Iowa State Senate
William M. Bennett (1869–1930), New York State Senate